André Basset (4 August 1895 – 24 January 1956) was a French linguist. René Basset was his father and Henri Basset his older brother.

Bibliography 
1929: La langue berbère. Morphologie. Le verbe: étude de thèmes, Paris, Leroux. [Riedizione Paris, L'Harmattan 2005 -  ].
1929: Études de géographie linguistique en Kabylie (sur quelques termes berbères concernant le corps, Paris, Leroux.
1932: "Note sur l'état d'annexion en berbère", Bulletin de la Société de Linguistique de Paris (BSL), 33 : 173-174.
1936: Atlas linguistique des parlers berbères. Algérie. Territoires du nord. Fasc. I, Équidés, Alger (25 carte + 91 pp.).
1939: Atlas linguistique des parlers berbères. Algérie. Territoires du nord. Fasc. II, Bovins, Alger (21 carte + 80 pp.).
1938: "Le nom de l'étable en Kabylie et la flexion du participe", BSL, 39/2 : 177-178.
1942: "Études de géographie linguistique dans le Sud marocain", Hespéris, 3-22.
1945: "Sur la voyelle initiale en berbère", Revue africaine, 82-88, repris en 1959, 83-89.
1946: "Le système phonologique du berbère", Comptes rendus du Groupe Linguistique d'Études Chamito-Sémitiques (GLECS), 4 (1945-1948), 33-36.
1948: Éléments de grammaire berbère (Kabylie - Irjen), with André Picart Alger, La Typo-Litho.
1949: "Sur berbère yir 'mauvais' chez les Irjen", Revue africaine,  291-313.
1949: "Sur le participe berbère", GLECS, 5 (1948-1951), 34-36.
1950: "Sur l'anticipation en berbère", Mélanges William Marçais, Paris, G.P. Maisonneuve, 17-27.
1952: La langue berbère, International African Institute, Oxford University Press, London – New York – Toronto (ried. 1959).
1954: "n  devant complément de nom en berbère", GLECS , 7 (1954-1957), p. 8-12.
Mémorial André Basset, 1895-1956, Paris, Adrien Maisonneuve, 1957
1959: Articles de dialectologie berbère (pref. E. Benveniste), Paris, Klincksieck.
1961: Textes berbères de l'Aurès (Parler des Aït Frah), Paris, Adrien-Maisonneuve.
1963: Textes berbères du Maroc (parler des Aït Sadden), Paris, Imprimerie nationale – Geuthner.

People from Lunéville
1895 births
1956 deaths
Berber languages
Linguists from France
Berberologists
20th-century linguists